NTV (Cyrillic: НТВ) is a Russian free-to-air television channel that was launched as a subsidiary of Vladimir Gusinsky's company .  Since 14 April 2001 Gazprom Media controls the network. NTV has no official meaning according to Igor Malashenko, the author of the name and co-founder of the company, but in the 1990s unofficial transcripts of the acronym include "New" (Novoje), "Independent" (Nezavisimoje), "Non-governmental" (Negosudarstvennoje), "Our" (Nashe).

History 
Vladimir Gusinsky founded NTV broadcasting in October 1993 on channel 4 moving to channel 5 in January 1994. He attracted talented journalists and news anchors of the time such as Tatiana Mitkova, Leonid Parfyonov, Mikhail Osokin, Yevgeniy Kiselyov, Vladimir A. Kara-Murza, Victor Shenderovich and others.  The channel set high professional standards in Russian television, broadcasting live coverage and sharp analysis of current events.  Starting before the dissolution of Soviet Union as Fourth Programme, the channel broadcast a daily news programme Segodnya and a weekly news-commentary programme Itogi which was jointly supported by the United States magazine Newsweek (at the time, a subsidiary of The Washington Post Company, now Graham Holdings Company).  In the early 1990s, a multibillion-dollar advertising agency, obtained exclusive advertising rights on NTV.

It commented favorably on President Boris Yeltsin's re-election campaign in 1996.

By 1999 NTV had achieved an audience of 102 million, covering about 70% of Russia's territory, and was available in other former Soviet republics.

During parliamentary elections in 1999 and presidential elections in 2000, NTV was critical of the Second Chechen War, Vladimir Putin and the political party Unity backed by him. In the puppet show Kukly ('Puppets') in the beginning of February 2000, the puppet of Putin acted as Little Zaches in a story based on E.T.A. Hoffmann's Little Zaches Called Cinnabar, in which blindness causes villagers mistake an evil gnome for a beautiful youth.  This provoked a fierce reaction from Putin's supporters. On 8 February the newspaper Sankt-Peterburgskie Vedomosti published a letter signed by the Rector of St. Petersburg State University Lyudmila Verbitskaya, the Dean of its Law Department Nikolay Kropachyov and some of Putin's other presidential campaign assistants that urged the prosecution of the authors of the show for what they considered a criminal offence.

Talk show with people of Ryazan and FSB members 
On 24 March 2000, two days before the presidential elections, NTV featured the Ryazan apartment bombing of fall 1999 in the talk show Independent Investigation. The interviews of the residents of the Ryazan apartment building, along with FSB public relations director Alexander Zdanovich and Ryazan branch head Alexander Sergeyev was filmed a few days earlier. On 26 March, Boris Nemtsov voiced his concern over the possible shut-down of NTV for airing the talk.

Seven months later, NTV general manager Igor Malashenko said at the JFK School of Government that the Information Minister Mikhail Lesin had warned him on several occasions. Malashenko's recollection of Lesin's warning was that by airing the talk show NTV had "crossed a line" and that the NTV managers were "outlaws" in the eyes of the Kremlin.

According to Alexander Goldfarb, Malashenko told him that Valentin Yumashev had brought a warning from the Kremlin, one day before the airing of the show, promising in no uncertain terms that the NTV managers "should consider themselves finished" if they went ahead with the broadcast.

Change of management 
On 11 May 2000, tax police, backed by officers from the general prosecutor's office and the FSB, stormed the Moscow headquarters of NTV and Media-Most and searched the premises for 12 hours.  Critics considered this move politically motivated, as NTV voiced opposition to Putin since his presidential electoral campaign.  Putin denied any involvement.

Viktor Shenderovich claimed that an unnamed top government official requested NTV to exclude the puppet of Putin from Kukly. Accordingly, in the following episode of the show, called "Ten Commandments", the puppet of Putin was replaced with a cloud covering the top of a mountain and a burning bush.

The program Itogi went on investigating corruption in the Russian government and the autumn 1999 blasts in Russia.

On 13 June 2000, Gusinsky was detained as a suspect in the General Prosecutor Office's criminal investigation of fraud between his Media-Most holding, Russkoye Video - 11th Channel Ltd. and the federal enterprise Russkoye Video.  At the time, Media-Most was involved in a dispute over the loan received from Gazprom. On the third day, however, he was released under the written undertaking not to leave the country.

On 15 July, the puppet of Putin acted in the Kukly show as Girolamo Savonarola.

On 19 July, investigators of the office of the Prosecutor General of Russia came to Gusinsky's home, distrained and arrested his property.

In a surprisingly informal deal, the charges against Gusinsky were lifted after he signed an agreement with Mikhail Lesin, Minister of Media, on 20 July.  Under the "shares for freedom" transaction or Protocol No.6 (Протокол N.6. Доля свободы) agreement, Gusinsky would discharge his debts by selling Media-Most to Gazprom-Media, which had held a 30% share of NTV since 1996, for the price imposed by the latter, and was given a guarantee that he would not be prosecuted. After leaving the country, Gusinsky claimed he was pressured to sign the agreement by the prospect of the criminal investigation. Media-Most refused to comply with the agreement.

Tax authorities brought a suit against Media-Most aiming to wind it up.

On 26 January 2001, Gazprom announced that it had acquired a controlling stake of 46% in NTV. The voting rights of a 19% stake held by Media-Most was frozen by a court decision.

Putin met with leading NTV journalists on 29 January, but the meeting changed nothing. The parties reasserted their positions; Putin denied any involvement and said that he could not interfere with the prosecutors and courts.

Around that time American media mogul Ted Turner (owner and founder of the Turner Broadcasting System subsidiary of Time Warner) appeared to be going to buy Gusinsky's share, but this has never happened.

On 3 April, Gazprom Media headed by Alfred Kokh by violating the procedure conducted a shareholders' meeting which removed Kiselyov from the NTV Director General position.

On 14 April 2001, Gazprom took over NTV by force and brought in its own management team. Its director-general Yevgeniy Kiselyov was replaced by Boris Jordan. Many leading journalists, including Yevgeniy Kiselyov, Svetlana Sorokina, Viktor Shenderovich, Vladimir A. Kara-Murza, Dmitry Dibrov, left the company. Leonid Parfyonov and Tatyana Mitkova remained. Kiselyov's Itogi program was closed down, replaced by Parfyonov's Namedni.

Citizens concerned by the threat to the freedom of speech in Russia argued that the financial pressure was inspired by the Vladimir Putin's government, which was often subject to NTV's criticism. Some tens of thousands of Russians rallied to the call of dissident NTV journalists in order to support the old NTV staff in April 2001.  Within the next couple of years, two independent TV channels which absorbed the former NTV journalists, TV-6 and TVS, were also shut down.

In January 2003, Boris Jordan was ousted as director general and replaced by Nikolay Senkevich, son of TV-presenter Yuri Senkevich from Channel One. A few days earlier he was also discharged from Media-Most director-general position, where he had replaced Alfred Kokh in October 2001. As insiders claimed, Jordan was sacked because NTV had carried a live translation of the culmination of the Moscow theater siege in October 2002 and had been too critical of the way authorities handled it.

Since then, entertaining talk-shows have become more prominent on NTV, rather than political programmes. However, unlike other leading TV channels in Russia, NTV went on reporting on-the-fly about some opposition activities and government failures, including the conflagrating fire of the Moscow Manege on the day of the Russian presidential elections on 14 March 2004, and the assassination of the pro-Russian President of Chechnya Akhmad Kadyrov on Victory Day 9 May 2004.

On 1 June 2004, Leonid Parfyonov, one of the last leading journalists from the old NTV staff who remained, and who was still critical of the government, was ousted from the channel, and his weekly news commentary programme Namedni was taken off the air. Its last announced episode never aired. Shortly before this, Parfyonov had been forbidden to present an interview with Malika Yandarbieva, widow of Chechen rebel leader Zelimkhan Yandarbiev. Zelimkhan Yandarbiev had been assassinated in exile in Qatar earlier that year. Parfyonov had shared this decision with the public on 31 May.

On 5 July 2004, Senkevich was replaced by Vladimir Kulistikov (b. 1952) as director general of NTV. Tamara Gavrilova, formerly a fellow student with Vladimir Putin at Leningrad State University, was appointed deputy director general.

Soon the political programmes Freedom Of Speech hosted by Savik Shuster (Shuster works in Ukraine since 2005), Personal Contribution hosted by Aleksandr Gerasimov, and Red Arrow were closed down.

Late 2000s 

From 2006 to 2009, NTV ran weekly news commentary programme Sunday Night in a talk-show format and political talk-show On The Stand, both hosted by Vladimir Solovyov, as well as weekly news commentary programme Real Politics hosted on Saturdays from 2005 to 2008 by political analyst and key Kremlin adviser Gleb Pavlovsky.

NTV began to be broadcast in widescreen in April 2013, hosted its own coverage of the 2014 Winter Olympics in Sochi, and joined the long list of Russian TV networks broadcasting in HD on 9 February 2015.

Artistic design 
The colorful "NTV" logo as well as the iconic green sphere were designed by Simon Levin, the Russian designer, and became a symbol for the new graphic language of television design in Russia.

Controversy 
In August 2014, NTV aired a documentary titled 13 Friends of the Junta, which described critics of Russia's policies in Ukraine as "traitors" and supporters of "fascists". The Moscow Times reported that footage of Andrei Makarevich's concert in Sviatohirsk "was merged with images of the fighting that he supposedly endorsed. The program never mentions that the concert was for the benefit of Ukraine's internally displaced children." Another program "Anatomy of a protest" was also presenting most of the anti-government protesters in former USSR countries as "Western puppets" or CIA inspired agents. The producers of the program, Pyotr Drogovoz and Liliya Parfyonova, were also accused of frequently receiving wiretap information from FSB which allowed them to pay surprise visits with camera on various opposition meetings.

In 2022 , the Denis Diderot Committee, a European group of academic researchers and professionals called for sanctions against NTV Plus for having cancelled various international news channels from its line-up. 

Logos 
The logo design has remained relatively the same since April 1994, with the НТВ typograph and a ball below the "T".

Logo history 
Its first logo in 1993 featured a simple НТВ typograph, but this was replaced with another logo on 11 April 1994, featuring the НТВ typograph with a ball. This would be the template for the succeeding 5 logos. During August 1994, the logo featured a white outline, though still retaining the НТВ typograph, and the ball has a gradient. However, in September 1994, this was replaced with a black-and-white striped outlined logo, with the ball touching the letters.

Over time, the ball would become larger, but since 2001, the ball is smaller. The 1997 logo featured an entirely black and thicker outline, and the ball has a glass feel. In 2001, a similar logo was launched, but with a blue outline and a smaller ball. On 4 June 2007, a new logo was launched, featuring the 2001 logo, but entirely white (except the ball) inside a green box. Logos similar to the current logo, with a larger typograph, are used in idents and promos. In 2010, a variant of the 2007 logo was introduced, but without the green box. It is commonly used as the on-screen bug, changing between it and the green box logo.

On-screen bug 
When it first launched on 10 October 1993, the logo was in the lower right corner. However, on 1 December that same year, the logo moved to the lower left.

See also 
 Media freedom in Russia
 Propaganda in Russia
 NTV Canada

Further reading

References

External links 

NTV America
NTV Mir (International)

 
Companies based in Moscow
Gazprom subsidiaries
Mass media companies of Russia
Russian-language television stations in Russia
Television networks in Russia
Television channels and stations established in 1993
1993 establishments in Russia
Vladimir Gusinsky